Pterocolus ovatus, known generally as the thief weevil or leaf roll thief, is a species of thief weevil in the family of beetles known as Attelabidae. It is found in North America. The thief weevil is an obligate egg predator and nest thief of Homoeolabus analis, the Oak Leaf-Rolling Weevil.

References

Further reading

 
 

Attelabidae
Articles created by Qbugbot
Beetles described in 1801